Wilderness Films India, Ltd. (stylized as wildfilmsindia) is a small production house based in New Delhi, India.

History 
The company was founded by nature Enthusiast Rupin Dang in the year of 1988. Who has over the years acquired incredible footage of India's many faces. This company came into news when they showed a video about April 2015 Nepal earthquake. on their YouTube channel. It owns a YouTube channel with name of WildFilmsIndia.

Interviews 
WFIL also takes interviews. They did an interview with Mahesh Bhatt.

See also 

 Production house

External links 
Official website

References 

Indian companies established in 1988
Indian YouTubers
Companies based in New Delhi